The following species in the grass genus Poa are accepted by Plants of the World Online. Speciation in this genus is marked by interspecific and even intergeneric hybridization events.

Poa abbreviata 
Poa acicularifolia 
Poa acinaciphylla 
Poa acroleuca 
Poa adusta 
Poa aequalis 
Poa aequatoriensis 
Poa aequigluma 
Poa affinis 
Poa afghanica 
Poa aitchisonii 
Poa ajanensis 
Poa akmanii 
Poa alberti 
Poa albescens 
Poa × alexandrae 
Poa almasovii 
Poa alopecurus 
Poa alpigena 
Poa alpina 
Poa alsodes 
Poa alta 
Poa amplexicaulis 
Poa amplivaginata 
Poa amurica 
Poa anae 
Poa anceps 
Poa androgyna 
Poa angustifolia 
Poa ankaratrensis 
Poa annua 
Poa antipoda 
Poa apiculata 
Poa arachnifera 
Poa araratica 
Poa archarensis 
Poa arctica 
Poa arechavaletae 
Poa arida 
Poa arnowiae 
Poa arzhanensis 
Poa asirensis 
Poa asperifolia 
Poa astonii 
Poa atropidiformis 
Poa atropurpurea 
Poa attalica 
Poa attenuata 
Poa aucklandica 
Poa auriculata 
Poa aurigae 
Poa × austrohercynica 
Poa austrokurilensis 
Poa austrouralensis 
Poa autumnalis 
Poa ayacuchensis 
Poa ayseniensis 
Poa babiogorensis 
Poa bactriana 
Poa badensis 
Poa bajaensis 
Poa balbisii 
Poa banffiana 
Poa bergii 
Poa beringiana 
Poa bigelovii 
Poa binata 
Poa binodis 
Poa bolanderi 
Poa boliviana 
Poa bomiensis 
Poa bonariensis 
Poa borbonica 
Poa boreorossica 
Poa borneensis 
Poa bradei 
Poa breviglumis 
Poa brevis 
Poa bromoides 
Poa buchananii 
Poa bucharica 
Poa bulbosa 
Poa burmanica 
Poa bussmannii 
Poa cabreriana 
Poa calchaquiensis 
Poa calliopsis 
Poa callosa 
Poa calycina 
Poa carazensis 
Poa carpatica 
Poa caucasica 
Poa celebica 
Poa celsa 
Poa cenisia 
Poa chaixii 
Poa chamaeclinos 
Poa chambersii 
Poa chapmaniana 
Poa chathamica 
Poa cheelii 
Poa chirripoensis 
Poa chokensis 
Poa cita 
Poa clavigera 
Poa clelandii 
Poa clivicola 
Poa × coarctata 
Poa cockayneana 
Poa colensoi 
Poa colombiana 
Poa × complanata 
Poa compressa 
Poa confinis 
Poa congesta 
Poa cookii 
Poa cooperi 
Poa cordemoyi 
Poa costiniana 
Poa crassicaudex 
Poa crassicaulis 
Poa crassinervis 
Poa cucullata 
Poa cumingii 
Poa curtifolia 
Poa cusickii 
Poa cuspidata 
Poa cyrenaica 
Poa czazhmensis 
Poa damavandica 
Poa darwiniana 
Poa davisii 
Poa deminuta 
Poa densa 
Poa denticulata 
Poa dentigluma 
Poa denudata 
Poa diaboli 
Poa diaphora 
Poa × digena 
Poa dimorphantha 
Poa dipsacea 
Poa disjecta 
Poa dissanthelioides 
Poa diversifolia 
Poa dolichophylla 
Poa dolosa 
Poa douglasii 
Poa dozyi 
Poa drummondiana 
Poa dudkinii 
Poa durifolia 
Poa dzongicola 
Poa egorovae 
Poa eleanorae 
Poa ensiformis 
Poa epileuca 
Poa erectifolia 
Poa exigua 
Poa faberi 
Poa falconeri 
Poa fauriei 
Poa fawcettiae 
Poa fax 
Poa fendleriana 
Poa ferreyrae 
Poa fibrifera 
Poa × figertii 
Poa filiculmis 
Poa fischeri 
Poa flabellata 
Poa flaccidula 
Poa flexuosa 
Poa foliosa 
Poa fordeana 
Poa × fossae-rusticorum 
Poa fragilis 
Poa gamblei 
Poa gammieana 
Poa × gandogeri 
Poa garhwalensis 
Poa × gaspensis 
Poa gayana 
Poa gigantea 
Poa gilgiana 
Poa glaberrima 
Poa glauca 
Poa gnutikovii 
Poa golestanensis 
Poa grandis 
Poa granitica 
Poa greuteri 
Poa grisebachii 
Poa guadianensis 
Poa gunnii 
Poa gymnantha 
Poa hachadoensis 
Poa hackelii 
Poa hakusanensis 
Poa halmaturina 
Poa hartzii 
Poa harveyi 
Poa hedbergii 
Poa helenae 
Poa helmsii 
Poa hentyi 
Poa × herjedalica 
Poa hesperia 
Poa hideaki-ohbae 
Poa hiemata 
Poa hieronymi 
Poa himalayana 
Poa hirtiglumis 
Poa hisauchii 
Poa hissarica 
Poa hitchcockiana 
Poa holciformis 
Poa homomalla 
Poa hookeri 
Poa horridula 
Poa hothamensis 
Poa howellii 
Poa huancavelicae 
Poa hubbardiana 
Poa huecu 
Poa humilis 
Poa humillima 
Poa hybrida 
Poa hylobates 
Poa hypsinephes 
Poa ibarii 
Poa iberica 
Poa iconia 
Poa igoshinae 
Poa imbecilla 
Poa imperialis 
Poa inconspicua 
Poa induta 
Poa infirma 
Poa interior 
Poa × intricata 
Poa intrusa 
Poa iridifolia 
Poa irkutica 
Poa janaensis 
Poa jansenii 
Poa jaunsarensis 
Poa × jemtlandica 
Poa jeremiadis 
Poa jubata 
Poa jugicola 
Poa × jurassica 
Poa kabalanica 
Poa kamczatensis 
Poa keckii 
Poa kelloggii 
Poa kenteica 
Poa kerguelensis 
Poa keysseri 
Poa khasiana 
Poa khokhrjakovii 
Poa kilimanjarica 
Poa kirkii 
Poa klokovii 
Poa koelzii 
Poa koksuensis 
Poa kolymensis 
Poa korshinskyi 
Poa krasnoborovii 
Poa kronokensis 
Poa krylovii 
Poa kuborensis 
Poa kulikovii 
Poa kurdistanica 
Poa kurtzii 
Poa kurynica 
Poa labillardierei 
Poa lachenensis 
Poa laegaardiana 
Poa laetevirens 
Poa lamii 
Poa lanata 
Poa langtangensis 
Poa languidior 
Poa lanigera 
Poa lanuginosa 
Poa lavrenkoi 
Poa laxa 
Poa laxiflora 
Poa lebedevae 
Poa legionensis 
Poa lehoueroui 
Poa leibergii 
Poa lepidula 
Poa leptalea 
Poa leptoclada 
Poa leptocoma 
Poa lettermanii 
Poa levitskyi 
Poa lhasaensis 
Poa ligularis 
Poa ligulata 
Poa lilloi 
Poa × limosa 
Poa lindebergii 
Poa lindsayi 
Poa linearifolia 
Poa lipskyi 
Poa litorosa 
Poa longifolia 
Poa longii 
Poa longiramea 
Poa × longriensis 
Poa lowanensis 
Poa lunata 
Poa macrantha 
Poa macroanthera 
Poa macrocalyx 
Poa macusaniensis 
Poa madecassa 
Poa × magadanensis 
Poa magadanica 
Poa magellensis 
Poa maia 
Poa mairei 
Poa maniototo 
Poa mannii 
Poa mansfieldii 
Poa marcida 
Poa margilicola 
Poa markgrafii 
Poa maroccana 
Poa marshallii 
Poa masenderana 
Poa matris-occidentalis 
Poa matsumurae 
Poa matthewsii 
Poa megalantha 
Poa meionectes 
Poa menachensis 
Poa mendocina 
Poa millii 
Poa minimiflora 
Poa minor 
Poa mireniana 
Poa moabitica 
Poa molinerii 
Poa mollis 
Poa morrisii 
Poa mucuchachensis 
Poa muktinathensis 
Poa mulalensis 
Poa mulleri 
Poa multinodis 
Poa × multnomae 
Poa muricata 
Poa mustangensis 
Poa myriantha 
Poa nankoensis 
Poa × nannfeldtii 
Poa napensis 
Poa navashinii 
Poa × nematophylla 
Poa nemoraliformis 
Poa nemoralis 
Poa neosachalinensis 
Poa nepalensis 
Poa nephelochloides 
Poa nervosa 
Poa nitidespiculata 
Poa nivicola 
Poa × nobilis 
Poa novae-zelandiae 
Poa novarae 
Poa nubensis 
Poa nubigena 
Poa nyaradyana 
Poa obvallata 
Poa occidentalis 
Poa olajensis 
Poa olonovae 
Poa opinata 
Poa orba 
Poa orientisibirica 
Poa orizabensis 
Poa orthoclada 
Poa orthophylla 
Poa paczoskii 
Poa pagophila 
Poa palmeri 
Poa paludigena 
Poa palustris 
Poa pannonica 
Poa paposana 
Poa papuana 
Poa parva 
Poa parvifolia 
Poa pattersonii 
Poa pauciflora 
Poa paucispicula 
Poa × pawlowskii 
Poa pearsonii 
Poa pedersenii 
Poa pentapolitana 
Poa perconcinna 
Poa perennis 
Poa perligulata 
Poa perrieri 
Poa persica 
Poa petrophila 
Poa petrosa 
Poa pfisteri 
Poa phillipsiana 
Poa physoclina 
Poa pilata 
Poa pilcomayensis 
Poa pitardiana 
Poa planifolia 
Poa platyantha 
Poa plicata 
Poa poiformis 
Poa polycolea 
Poa polyneura 
Poa × poppelwellii 
Poa populetorum 
Poa porphyroclados 
Poa pratensis 
Poa prichardii 
Poa primae 
Poa pringlei 
Poa pseudamoena 
Poa pseudoabbreviata 
Poa pseudoattenuata 
Poa pseudobulbosa 
Poa pseudoradula 
Poa pseudoschimperiana 
Poa pulviniformis 
Poa pumila 
Poa pumilio 
Poa pusilla 
Poa pygmaea 
Poa qinghaiensis 
Poa quadrata 
Poa radula 
Poa raduliformis 
Poa ragonesei 
Poa rajbhandarii 
Poa ramifera 
Poa ramoniana 
Poa ramosissima 
Poa rauhii 
Poa reclinata 
Poa reflexa 
Poa rehmannii 
Poa reitzii 
Poa remota 
Poa resinulosa 
Poa rhadina 
Poa rhizomata 
Poa rigidula 
Poa riphaea 
Poa rodwayi 
Poa royleana 
Poa ruprechtii 
Poa ruwenzoriensis 
Poa × sachalinensis 
Poa saksonovii 
Poa salinostepposa 
Poa sallacustris 
Poa saltuensis 
Poa sanchez-vegae 
Poa sandvicensis 
Poa × sanionis 
Poa scaberula 
Poa scabrivaginata 
Poa schimperiana 
Poa schistacea 
Poa schizantha 
Poa schmidtiana 
Poa schoenoides 
Poa × sclerocalamos 
Poa secunda 
Poa sejuncta 
Poa seleri 
Poa sellovii 
Poa senex 
Poa serpana 
Poa setulosa 
Poa shumushuensis 
Poa sibirica 
Poa sichotensis 
Poa sieberiana 
Poa sierrae 
Poa sikkimensis 
Poa simensis 
Poa sinaica 
Poa sintenisii 
Poa siphonoglossa 
Poa skvortzovii 
Poa smirnowii 
Poa spania 
Poa speluncarum 
Poa sphondylodes 
Poa spiciformis 
Poa spicigera 
Poa stapfiana 
Poa stebbinsii 
Poa stellaris 
Poa stenantha 
Poa sterilis 
Poa stewartiana 
Poa stiriaca 
Poa strictiramea 
Poa stuckertii 
Poa suavis 
Poa subinsignis 
Poa sublanata 
Poa sublimis 
Poa subspicata 
Poa subvestita 
Poa sudicola 
Poa sugawarae 
Poa suksdorfii 
Poa sunbisinii 
Poa superlanata 
Poa supina 
Poa swallenii 
Poa sylvestris 
Poa szechuensis 
Poa takasagomontana 
Poa talamancae 
Poa talikensis 
Poa tanfiljewii 
Poa tangii 
Poa × taurica 
Poa tayacajaensis 
Poa telata 
Poa tenera 
Poa tenerrima 
Poa tenkensis 
Poa tennantiana 
Poa tenuicula 
Poa teretifolia 
Poa thessala 
Poa thomasii 
Poa tianschanica 
Poa timoleontis 
Poa tolmatchewii 
Poa tonsa 
Poa tovarii 
Poa trachyantha 
Poa trachyphylla 
Poa tracyi 
Poa trichophylla 
Poa tricolor 
Poa trinervis 
Poa triodioides 
Poa trivialiformis 
Poa trivialis 
Poa trollii 
Poa tuberifera 
Poa tucumana 
Poa tuonnachensis 
Poa turgensis 
Poa tuvinensis 
Poa tzvelevii 
Poa × tzyrenovae 
Poa ullungdoensis 
Poa umbricola 
Poa umbrosa 
Poa unilateralis 
Poa unispiculata 
Poa ursina 
Poa urssulensis 
Poa urubambensis 
Poa uruguayensis 
Poa ussuriensis 
Poa uzonica 
Poa vaginata 
Poa verae 
Poa veresczaginii 
Poa versicolor 
Poa vorobievii 
Poa vvedenskyi 
Poa wallowensis 
Poa wardiana 
Poa wendtii 
Poa wheeleri 
Poa wilhelminae 
Poa × wippraensis 
Poa wisselii 
Poa wolfii 
Poa xenica 
Poa xingkaiensis 
Poa yaganica 
Poa yatsugatakensis 
Poa zhirmunskii 
Poa zhongdianensis

References

Poa